The Hard Life of an Adventurer is a 1941 Czech crime-comedy film directed by Martin Frič.

Cast
 Otomar Korbelář as Fred Flok alias Konzul Binder alias Komisar Niklas alias Ing. Benda
 Ladislav Pešek as Karel Kryspín alias Charles Crispin
 Adina Mandlová as Helena Rohanová
 Jaroslav Marvan as Tichý, policejní inspektor
 Karel Dostal as Dr. Seidl
 Karel Cerný as Antonín Bures (as K.V. Cerný)
 Vladimír Repa as Pokladník
 Karel Hradilák as Karel
 Rudolf Hrušínský as Lupic
 R. A. Dvorský as Singer
 František Filipovský as Starik

References

External links
 

1941 films
1941 comedy films
1940s crime comedy films
1940s Czech-language films
Czechoslovak black-and-white films
Films directed by Martin Frič
Czechoslovak crime comedy films
Czech crime comedy films
1940s Czech films